The House of Representatives was the lower chamber of the parliament of Ceylon (now Sri Lanka) established in 1947 by the Soulbury Constitution. The House was housed in the old State Council building in Galle Face Green, Colombo and met for the first time on 14 October 1947. The First Republican Constitution of Sri Lanka, adopted on 22 May 1972, replaced the House of Representatives (and Parliament of Ceylon) with the unicameral National State Assembly.

Membership
The House of Representatives initially consisted of 101 members, of whom 95 were elected by the electors of the 89 electoral districts and six appointed by the Governor-General, on the advice of the Prime Minister. The members were known as "Members of Parliament". The six appointed members represented important interests which were not represented or inadequately represented in the House, they were usually from the European and Burgher communities and on occasions from the Indian Tamils and Muslim (Moors or Malays) groups. On a few occasions caste groups from within the Sinhalese and Tamils also obtained representation in Parliament as appointed members.

The fourth amendment to the Soulbury Constitution increased the number of members to 157 (151 elected from 145 electoral districts and six appointed).

Electoral districts
The initial 89 electoral districts consisted of 84 single-member districts, four two-member districts (Ambalangoda-Balapitiya, Badulla, Balangoda and Kadugannawa) and one three-member district (Colombo Central). From March 1960 there were 145 electoral districts consisting of 140 single-member districts, four two-member districts (Akurana, Batticaloa, Colombo South and Mutur) and one three-member district (Colombo Central).

Speakers

 Alfred Francis Molamure (1947–51)
 Albert F. Peries (1951–56)
 H. S. Ismail (1956–59)
 T. B. Subasinghe (1960)
 R. S. Pelpola (1960–64)
 Hugh Fernando (1964)
 Albert F. Peries (1965–67)
 Shirley Corea (1967–70)
 Stanley Tillekeratne (1970–72)

Deputy Speaker and Chairman of Committees
 R. A. de Mel (1947–48)
 H. W. Amarasuriya (1948)
 Albert F. Peries (1948–51)
 H. S. Ismail (1951–56)
 Piyasena Tennakoon (1956–58)
 R. S. Pelpola (1958–60)
 Hugh Fernando (1960–64)
 D. A. Rajapaksa (1964)
 Shirley Corea (1965–67)
 Razik Fareed (1967–68)
 Murugesu Sivasithamparam (1968–70)
 I. A. Cader (1970–72)

See also
 Legislative Council of Ceylon
 National State Assembly
 Parliament of Ceylon
 Parliament of Sri Lanka
 Senate of Ceylon
 State Council of Ceylon

References
Notes

Bibliography

External links
 Parliament of Sri Lanka

1947 establishments in Ceylon
1972 disestablishments in Sri Lanka
Government of Sri Lanka
Defunct lower houses